Emilia is a feminine Italian given name of Latin origin. The name is popular all over Europe and the Americas. The corresponding masculine name is Emilio. Emily is the English form of the Italian name.

Etymology
Emilia is derived from Aemilia, the feminine form of the Latin nomen Aemilius. The name is likely derived from the same root as the Latin word aemulus, which means to rival, excel, or emulate, but this may be a folk etymology.

Although similar Germanic names like Amalia may appear to be related to Emilia, Emily and Aemilia, they in fact have a different origin.
In Greek, it is often written in the form "Αιμιλία" cognate to the Balkan Mountains of Haemus "Αίμος" and the ancient and modern greek word for blood "Αίμα".

Popularity
, records indicate that more than 13,500 girls in the United States have been named Emilia since 1880, with numbers increasing markedly from the year 2000.

People with this name
 Emilia (Bulgarian singer) (born 1982), full name Emiliya Valeva, known by the mononym Emilia
 Emilia Appelqvist (born 1990), Swedish soccer player
 Emilia Attías (born 1987), Argentine actress and model
 Emilia Brodin (born 1990), Swedish footballer
 Emilia Broomé (1866–1925), Swedish politician
 Emilia Cano (born 1968), Spanish race walker
 Dorina Emilia Carbune (born 1985), Romanian handball player
 Emilia Clarke (born 1986), British actress
 Emília Coranty Llurià (1862-1944), Spanish painter 
 Emilia Dafni (1881–1941), Greek writer
 Emilia Fester (born 1998), German politician
 Emilia Fox (born 1974), British actress
 Emilia of Gaeta (died 1036), duchess of Gaeta
 Emilia Gierczak (1925–1945), Polish soldier
 Emilia Goggi (1817–1857), Italian operatic mezzo-soprano
 Emilia Kilpua (born 1977), Finnish space scientist
 Emilia Lanier (1569–1645), English poet
 Emilia Malessa (1909–1949), Polish soldier, member of the Home Army during WWII
 Emilia Müller (born 1951), German chemical technician and politician
 Emilia Nilsson (born 2003), Swedish diver
 Emilia Nyström (born 1983), Finnish beach volleyball player
 Emilia Papadopoulos (born 1987), Cypriot-British journalist
 Emilia Pardo Bazan (1851–1921), Spanish writer
 Emilia Pikkarainen (born 1992), Finnish swimmer
 Emilia Plater (1806–1831), Polish patriot and revolutionary
 Emilia Ramboldt (earlier Emilia Andersson) (born 1988), Swedish ice hockey player
 Emilia Rotter (1906–2003), Hungarian 4x world champion figure skater
 Emilia Ramboldt (born 1988), Swedish ice hockey player
 Emilia Rydberg (born 1978), Swedish pop singer
 Emilia Schüle (born 1992), Russian-born German actress
 Emilia Tsoulfa (born 1973), Greek sailor
 Emilia Uggla (1819–1855), Swedish pianist
 Emilia Unda (1879–1939), German actress
 Emília Vášáryová (born 1942), Slovak actress
 Emilia Vuorisalmi (born 1979), Finnish medical doctor, TV personality and entrepreuner
 Emilia Kaczorowska Wojtyla (born 1884), the mother of Pope John Paul II
 Emilia Simonen (born 1996), Finnish figure skater
 Emilia Soini (born 1995), Finnish squash player
 Emilia Vesa (born 2001), Finnish ice hockey player

Fictional characters
Emilia, one of the seven women occurring in the character of narrators in The Decameron by Giovanni Boccaccio
Emília, one of the main characters in the Brazilian children's novel series Sítio do Picapau Amarelo by Monteiro Lobato
Emilia, a character from William Shakespeare's play Othello
Emilia Ridderfjell, a character from the novel series The Bert Diaries
Emilia, from the indie visual novel Digital: A Love Story
Emilia (Re:Zero), the female protagonist from the Japanese light novel series Re:Zero − Starting Life in Another World
Emilia, or Emi Yusa, the female protagonist from the Japanese light novel series The Devil Is a Part-Timer!
Emilia "Emmy" O'Malley, supporting character in Delicious

Variant forms
Emily

References

Feminine given names
Italian feminine given names
Finnish feminine given names